Edward Newman may refer to:

Edward A. Newman (1853–1909), American businessman
Edward Newman (entomologist) (1801–1876), English entomologist, botanist and writer
Edward Newman (New Zealand politician) (1858–1946), Reform Party Member of Parliament
Edward Newman (Australian politician) (1832–1872), businessman and accountant in colonial Western Australia
Edward Newman (political scientist), British political scientist</onlyinclude>
Eddy Newman (born 1953), former member of the European Parliament
Edward "Ted" Newman (born 1918), a Walthamstow born scientist who helped develop Alan Turing’s ideas for general purpose stored-program computer into a working machine – the Pilot ACE.

See also
Ed Newman (born 1951), offensive guard

Eddie Newman (disambiguation)